William N. Montgomery (June 3, 1923 – August 21, 2003) was a professional American football player who played halfback in the National Football League (NFL) with the Chicago Cardinals for one season, in 1946. He played in three games and had eight rushing attempts for 11 yards. He attended Louisiana State University where he played college football for the LSU Tigers football team.

References

1923 births
2003 deaths
Chicago Cardinals players
LSU Tigers football players
American football halfbacks